Robert Youngson (November 27, 1917 – April 8, 1974) was a film producer, director, and screenwriter, specializing in reviving antique silent films.

Biography

Robert George Youngson, born in Brooklyn, New York, graduated from Harvard University with a master's degree in business administration. He entered the film business in 1941, writing newsreel scripts. In 1948 Warner Bros. hired him to produce a series of short subjects about sports. Most of these were straight roundups of current sporting events, but in some of them Youngson indulged his fascination with antique newsreels of the 1920s, and included vintage sports footage in the new productions. This led to Youngson writing and producing a long series of historical short subjects for Warners, two of which won him Academy Awards. Most of these films took an affectionate look back at the fads and lifestyles of the 1920s. Youngson's narration was nostalgic in tone, unlike the facetious commentaries that usually accompanied silent-film revivals like Gaslight Follies (1945) and Warners' compilations of Mack Sennett comedies. Youngson also produced a feature-length documentary for Warners, Fifty Years Before Your Eyes (1950).

Warners discontinued live-action short subjects in 1956 and released Youngson, forcing him to work as an independent producer. He assembled a full-length feature of silent-comedy highlights, The Golden Age of Comedy (1958). This was a triumphant success, earning rave reviews from national columnists and receiving network exposure on TV talk shows. He followed this with When Comedy Was King (1960) and six more vintage-comedy anthologies, the last being released in 1970.

Academy Awards and nominations
He was nominated six times for the Academy Award for Best Live Action Short Film (one reel).

Full list of Short Films
All produced by Warner Bros. and narrators included Dan Donaldson, Jackson Beck, Clem McCarthy, Dwight Weist, Ward Wilson and Jay Jackson. Walton C. Ament produced the earliest shorts. Those not part of a series were marketed as “varieties” and “novelties”.

Football Magic (two reel “Classic of the Screen”) - September 4, 1948
Roaring Wheels (Sports News Review) - October 2, 1948
Ski Devils (Sports News Review) - December 4, 1948
Swim Parade (Sports News Review) - February 5, 1949
Batter Up (Sports News Review) - April 9, 1949
They're Off (Sports News Review) - June 18, 1949
Spills and Chills (Sports News Review) - August 13, 1949 (DVD release: It's a Great Feeling:  TCM Doris Day Collection)
Pigskin Passes (two reel “Classic of the Screen”) - September 23, 1949
A-Speed on the Deep - December 24, 1949
Shoot the Basket (two reel “Classic of the Screen”) - April 29, 1950
A Cavalcade of Girls - August 12, 1950
Blaze Busters - December 30, 1950
Horsehide Heroes - March 10, 1951
World of Kids - June 23, 1951
Disaster Fighters - August 11, 1951
Lighter than Air - October 20, 1951
Animals Have All the Fun - April 19, 1952
Daredevil Days - August 9, 1952
Too Much Speed - January 3, 1953
No Adults Allowed - April 11, 1953
Head Over Heels - June 20, 1953
Looking At Life (two reel “Classic of the Screen”) - July 18, 1953
Say It with Spills- October 24, 1953
Magic Movie Moments - December 26, 1953
They Were Champions (two reel “Classic of the Screen”) - January 23, 1954
I Remember When  - March 19, 1954
This Wonderful World (two reel “Classic of the Screen”) - March 27, 1954
Thrills from the Past - May 8, 1954
When Sports Were King - June 19, 1954
This Was Yesterday (two reel “Classic of the Screen”) - July 31, 1954
This Mechanical Age - August 28, 1954
Camera Hunting (two reel “Classic of the Screen”) - November 20, 1954
A Bit of the Best - December 25, 1954
Those Exciting Days - March 12, 1955
When the Talkies Were Young (two reel “Classic of the Screen”) - March 26, 1955 (DVD release The Jazz Singer & Lucky Me (film))
Fire, Wind and Flood - April 30, 1955
Some of the Greatest - June 18, 1955
The Glory Around Us (two reel “Classic of the Screen”) - July 2, 1955
Gadgets Galore - July 30, 1955 (DVD release: Pete Kelly's Blues (film))
An Adventure to Remember - October 1, 1955
It Happened to You (two reel “Classic of the Screen”) - December 31, 1955
Faster and Faster - January 21, 1956
The Picture Parade (two reel “Classic of the Screen”) - March 31, 1956
I Never Forget a Face - April 28, 1956
Through the Camera's Eyes (two reel “Classic of the Screen”) - August 11, 1956
Animals and Kids - August 18, 1956

Feature-film compilations
Youngson also produced the following feature-length compilations:

Fifty Years Before Your Eyes (1950)
The Golden Age of Comedy (1957)
When Comedy Was King (1960)
Days of Thrills and Laughter (1961)
30 Years of Fun (1963)
M-G-M's Big Parade of Comedy (1964)
Laurel and Hardy's Laughing 20's (1965)
The Further Perils of Laurel and Hardy (1967)
4 Clowns (1970)

Private life and death
He died at St. Vincent's Hospital in New York City at age 56, survived by his wife Jeanne Keyes.

Further reading
 Scott MacGillivray. Laurel & Hardy: From the Forties Forward, Second Edition, Revised and Expanded. New York: iUniverse, 2009; First edition Lanham, Maryland: Vestal Press, 1998. . (Includes interviews with William K. Everson and Mrs. Robert Youngson)

See also
List of short subjects by Hollywood studio#Warner Brothers

References

External links 

People from Brooklyn
1917 births
1974 deaths
Producers who won the Live Action Short Film Academy Award
Film producers from New York (state)
20th-century American businesspeople
Film directors from New York City
Harvard Business School alumni